This article lists diplomatic missions resident in Hungary. At present, the capital city of Budapest hosts 86 embassies. Several other countries have honorary consuls to provide emergency services to their citizens and several countries have non-resident embassies accredited from other capitals, such as Vienna and Berlin.

Diplomatic missions in Budapest

Consulates in Hungary

Missions 
 (Delegation)

Accredited embassies 
Resident in Vienna, Austria:

Resident in Berlin, Germany:

 
 
 

 
 
 

Resident in Brussels, Belgium:

 
 
 

Resident in Moscow, Russia:

 

Resident elsewhere:

 (Geneva)
 (Geneva)
 (Paris)
 (Prague)
 (Belgrade)
 (Reykjavik)
 (Rome)
 (Geneva)
 (Valletta)
 (Belgrade)
 (San Marino)

Closed embassies

See also 
 Foreign relations of Hungary
 Visa requirements for Hungarian citizens

Notes

References

External links 
 Embassies in Hungary

 
Diplomatic
Hungary